Prof. Dr. Walter Schleger (19 September 1929 – 3 December 1999) was an Austrian football player.

Club career
A speedy and tricky attacker, Schleger played for several clubs: he began his career in Sparta Prague, where he played in their youth team, later went to Vienna and played for Wiener Sportclub (1949–1951) and Austria Wien (1951–1964).

A veterinarian, he later became head of the genetics institute at the University of Veterinary Medicine Vienna.

International career
He made his debut for Austria in a September 1951 friendly match against West Germany and was a participant at the 1954 FIFA World Cup and 1958 FIFA World Cup. He earned 22 caps, scoring one goal.

Honours
Austrian Football Bundesliga (4):
 1953, 1961, 1962, 1963
Austrian Cup (3):
 1960, 1962, 1963

External links
 Austria Wien archive

References

1929 births
1999 deaths
Austria international footballers
Austrian footballers
1954 FIFA World Cup players
1958 FIFA World Cup players
AC Sparta Prague players
FK Austria Wien players
Austrian veterinarians
Czech veterinarians
German Bohemian people
Austrian people of German Bohemian descent
Footballers from Prague
Footballers from Vienna
20th-century Austrian zoologists
Association football forwards